Jalan Jenderal Gatot Subroto (Gatot Subroto Avenue) is one of the major road in Jakarta, Indonesia. The road starts from Dirgantara statue in South Jakarta, which crosses 10 administrative villages and ends at Slipi, Central Jakarta. The road is named after National Hero of Indonesia General Gatot Subroto. The road was constructed in 1960s. The road runs parallel with Jakarta Inner Ring Road. The location of the road is within the Golden Triangle CBD of Jakarta. Many important office buildings and skyscrapers are situated along the road.

Major buildings in the Gatot Subroto Road

West : GP Plaza

East : Jakarta Design Center , Dipo Tower, and Bangun Tjipta

Slipi Intersection (towards Jalan Palmerah Utara and Jalan Aipda KS Tubun)

Intersections
The road has 7 intersections,
 At Digantara statue towards Kasablanka and Kalibata Heroes Cemetery;
 towards southwest to Kapten Tendean Street (head office of Trans TV);
towards HR Rasuna Said Street and Pasar Minggu;
At Semanggi Interchange towards Jalan Jenderal Sudirman and Senayan;
 Adjacent to Gelora Bung Karno Stadium towards Senayan;
 towards east adjacent to Pejompongan.
 Towards to Jalan Palmerah Utara and KS Tubun Road (Slipi)

Transportation

Bus routes

Transjakarta 

There are seven bus stops for the TransJakarta BRT along Jalan Jenderal Gatot Subroto, mainly serving for Corridor 9. They are:
 Pancoran Barat, near Smesco Indonesia
 Tegal Parang, near Mercure Hotel Jakarta Gatot Subroto and the head office of Ministry of Industry
 Kuningan Barat, near the intersection with the Mampang Prapatan Street and HR Rasuna Said Street
 Gatot Subroto Jamsostek, at the front of Menara Jamsostek
 Gatot Subroto LIPI, in front of the office of the Indonesian Institute of Sciences (Temporarily closed for renovation since September 4, 2022)
 Semanggi, located at the Semanggi Interchange
 Senayan JCC, at the front of the Jakarta Convention Center
 Slipi Petamburan, near Jakarta Design Center and GP Plaza 
Transjakarta bus routes that serves this road are:

 Corridor 4K
 Corridor  (Ragunan–Monas via Semanggi)
 Corridor  (Pinang Ranti–Pluit)
 Corridor  (PGC 2–Grogol 2–Pluit)
 Corridor  (Pinang Ranti-Kota)
 Corridor  (Pinang Ranti-Bundaran Senayan)
 Corridor 9K (Kampung Rambutan–Grogol 2)
 Corridor 9M (Pinang Ranti–Halimun)
 Corridor 13C (Puri Beta–Dukuh Atas 1)

Other Buses 
Apart from Transjakarta, here are the lists of public transportation routes that serves the Gatot Subroto Street:
 Kopaja S602 Tanah Abang-Ragunan (via Komdak - Casablanca)
 Kopaja S612 Kampung Melayu-Ragunan (via Mampang - Kemang Timur)
 Kopaja S13 Ragunan-Grogol
 Kopaja S66 Blok M-Manggarai
 Koantas Bima P102 Tanah Abang-Ciputat
 Kowanbisata T512 Pulo Gadung-Ciputat
 Metromini S640 Pasar Minggu-Tanah Abang
 PPD AC10 Kampung Rambutan-Dukuh Atas
 PPD AC17 Dukuh Atas-Bekasi (via Bulak Kapal)
 PPD AC80 Kampung Rambutan-Blok M
 PPD P45 Blok M-Poris Plawad
 PPD P54 Grogol-Depok
 PPD 45 Cililitan-Blok M
 PPD 213 Grogol-Kampung Melayu
 AJA P AC119 Kampung Melayu-Poris Plawad
 AJA P AC138 Blok M-Poris Plawad
 Mayasari Bakti P02A Kampung Rambutan-Kalideres (via Komdak - Slipi - Grogol - Tomang - UKI - Ps. Rebo)
 Mayasari Bakti P55 Kampung Rambutan-Grogol (via Komdak - Slipi - Tomang - UKI - Ps. Rebo)
 Mayasari Bakti R57 Pulo Gadung-Blok M (via Mampang - Pancoran - UKI - Bypass - Pemuda)
 Mayasari Bakti AC02 Kampung Rambutan-Kalideres (via Komdak - Slipi - Grogol - Tomang - Tol - Ps. Rebo)
 Mayasari Bakti AC02A Kampung Rambutan-Kalideres (via Slipi - Grogol - Tomang - Tol - Ps. Rebo)
 Mayasari Bakti AC05 Blok M-Bekasi (via Polda - Komdak - Jatibening - Bekasi Barat)
 Mayasari Bakti AC05 Blok M-Bekasi (via Polda - Komdak - Bekasi Timur)
 Mayasari Bakti AC05A Blok M-Kota Harapan Indah (via Polda - Komdak - Jatibening - GOR Bekasi - Perumnas 1 - Kranji)
 Mayasari Bakti AC34 Blok M-Poris Plawad (via Slipi - Polda - Kebon Jeruk - Karawaci)
 Mayasari Bakti AC42A Kalideres-Cileungsi (via Daan Mogot - Grogol - Tomang - Slipi - Komdak - Tol - Cibubur)
 Mayasari Bakti AC49 Blok M-Tanjung Priok (via Slipi - Polda - Grogol - Tomang - Slipi)
 Mayasari Bakti AC52 Tanah Abang-Bekasi (via Komdak - Sudirman - Thamrin - Jatibening - Bekasi Timur)
 Mayasari Bakti AC52A Tanah Abang-Jatiasih (via Komdak - Sudirman - Thamrin - Jatibening - Tol JORR)
 Mayasari Bakti AC62 Senen-Poris Plawad (via Sudirman - Thamrin - Slipi - Kebon Jeruk - Karawaci)
 Mayasari Bakti AC70 Tanah Abang-Kampung Rambutan (via Komdak - Sudirman - Thamrin - Tol - UKI)
 Mayasari Bakti AC70A Tanah Abang-Cileungsi (via Komdak - Sudirman - Thamrin - Cibubur)
 Mayasari Bakti AC81 Kalideres-Depok (via Daan Mogot - Grogol - Tomang - Slipi - Komdak - Pancoran - Ps. Minggu - Lt. Agung)
 Mayasari Bakti AC121 Blok M-Cikarang (via Komdak - Polda - Jatibening - Cikarang Barat)
 Mayasari Bakti AC121A Blok M-Jababeka (via Komdak - Polda - Jatibening - Cikarang Barat)
 DAMRI: Plaza Blok M—Soekarno-Hatta Airport
 DAMRI: Lebak Bulus—Soekarno-Hatta Airport

Train Lines

Greater Jakarta LRT 
The Gatot Subroto Street is also served by the Cibubur  and Bekasi Line  of the Greater Jakarta LRT. There's only one station

 Pancoran Station

Gallery

See also
History of Jakarta
Jalan HR Rasuna Said
Gatot Soebroto

References

Roads of Jakarta
Central Jakarta